is a hospital founded in 1873. The hospital is located in Tennōji-ku, Osaka, Japan. It is the oldest hospital of the Anglican Church in Japan.

Characteristics
The nearest station is Ōsaka Uehommachi Station. The hospital has long been committed to maternal health care and delivers more than 1,000 births a year.

History

1873
 Mar. - Dr. Henry Lanning (M. D.) in Syracuse, New York, was appointed as a missionary doctor by the Episcopal Church of the United States.
 Jul. 4th - Dr. Lanning arrived at Osaka
 This year he started to provide medical services at his house in Yorikichō, Nishi-ku, Osaka. He also studied Japanese.

1874
 Jan. - US Japan Missionary Clinic was opened at Umehommachi 7, Nishi-ku, Osaka.
 Dr. Lanning treated more than a thousand patients for free in the half year after this clinic was opened. He also sold and lent many Christian books in Japanese, in Chinese, and in English.

1877
 Apr. - He established another clinic in the central Osaka, and the first clinic in Umehommachi became a branch. 

1878
 He treated about 2.5 thousand patients at those clinics, and the bishop Channing Moore Williams reported his contribution to the headquarter in the United States. 

1880
 Lanning's medical works successfully developed, and doctors of the clinics argued to build a hospital in Osaka. They asked the US headquarter to send money for the hospital, and female working groups in New York promised to send money for the project.

1883
 Sep. - A new two-story hospital made by wood was completed at Kawaguchi-cho 8, and Dr. Lanning became a president of the hospital. He officially named the hospital "St. Barnabas' hospital." A missionary of the US Episcopal Church, Theodosius Stevens Tyng supervised the construction of the hospital.

1884
 Apr. - Frances J. Shaw living in Osaka was recruited as a chief nurse. This position was assigned to foreign women after several years.

1885
 Jun. - Shaw resigned the hospital. The number of personnels from the mission decreased, but staff staying the hospital kept their effort and the hospital was successfully developed. 
 920 patients visited the hospital for 4,869 times, and 74 patients stayed at the hospital this year.

1887
 The number of patients of the hospital and another clinic in Tokyo (later St. Luke's International Hospital) smoothly increased.

1888
 The number of visiting patients increased to 8,224, and 88 patients stayed at the hospital this year. 

1913
 Dr. Lanning who had worked in Japan for almost 40 years returned to the United States because he got old, and his son became the second president of the hospital.

1923
 The hospital moved to Saikudani, Tennōji.

1928
 The main building designed by William Merrell Vories was completed.

1941
 Shōzō Nisizaki became the seventh president of the hospital as the first Japanese president.

1942
 An affiliated midwife school, "Jōnan Midwife School" was established.

1943
 The hospital's name changed to "Osaka Daitōa Hospital" because of the war.

1945
 The name returned to "St. Barnabas' Hospital," and the affiliated school renamed "St. Barnabas' Hospital Midwife School."

2005
 The new hospital building was completed.

Medical Department
 Obstetrics
 Gynecology
 Pediatrics

Access
 10 minutes walk from Ōsaka Uehommachi Station
 15 minutes walk from Tsuruhashi Station
 17 minutes walk from Tanimachi Kyūchōme Station

See also
 St. Luke's International Hospital

References

External links
 Official website

Christianity in Osaka
Hospital buildings completed in 2005
Hospitals established in 1873
Hospitals in Osaka
Christian hospitals
Anglican Church in Japan
1873 establishments in Japan